The 2018 ACC women's basketball tournament, which ended the 2017–18 season of the Atlantic Coast Conference, was held at Greensboro Coliseum in Greensboro, North Carolina, from February 28–March 4, 2018. Louisville, which finished atop the ACC regular-season table along with Notre Dame, won the tournament and with it the ACC's automatic bid to the 2018 NCAA Women's Division I Basketball Tournament.

Seeds

Schedule

Source:

Bracket

See also

2018 ACC men's basketball tournament

References

2017–18 Atlantic Coast Conference women's basketball season
ACC women's basketball tournament
Basketball competitions in Greensboro, North Carolina
ACC Women's Basketball
Women's sports in North Carolina
College sports in North Carolina